Karthik Kumar (born 21 November 1977) is an Indian stand-up comedian and actor in the Tamil film and television industries.

Biography 
He studied chemical engineering in Sri Venkateswara College of Engineering.

After earning his Bachelor's degree, Karthik along with his friend Sunil Vishnu quit their respective jobs and started the event management company "Evam", which today is a theatre company of renown. Karthik made his acting debut with Alaipayuthey (2000) portraying a small role as the female lead character's prospective suitor. He was first tested for the role of R. Madhavan in the film but was rejected as he was too young with no acting experience at the time. He went on to portray supporting roles notably in films like Yaaradi Nee Mohini (2008) and Poi Solla Porom (2008).

In November 2016, Karthik lamented getting typecast in particular roles, especially as the American mappillai, and announced his retirement from the film industry. However, he returned with a role in Rocketry: The Nambi Effect (2022).

Karthik Kumar is also a stand-up comedian who has done three stand-up specials. His first special, "#PokeMe" has more than half a million views on YouTube. His second special was titled "Second Decoction" followed by "Blood Chutney" streaming on Amazon Prime. He has performed over 1000 shows across India, USA, UK, Singapore, Malaysia and Hong Kong. He is managed by Evam Standup Tamasha, a stand-up movement in South India.

Personal life 
Karthik Kumar married Suchitra, a singer, in 2005. The couple parted ways in 2017. In December 2021, he married actress Amrutha Srinivasan.

Filmography

Actor

Director

Television

Voice artist 
 For Atul Kulkarni in Aval (2017, Tamil)

References

External links 

1977 births
Living people
Tamil male television actors
Tamil television presenters
Television personalities from Tamil Nadu
Male actors from Tamil Nadu
Male actors in Tamil cinema
21st-century Tamil male actors
Indian stand-up comedians
Male actors in Hindi cinema
Indian male film actors
Male actors from Chennai